Gulzar is a village of Mandi Bahauddin District in the Punjab province of Pakistan. It is located at 32°26'30N 73°21'5E lying to the south-east of the district capital Mandi Bahauddin - with an altitude of 201 metres (662 feet).

References

Villages in Mandi Bahauddin District